Shahrivash, also known as Shahrnush, was the ruler of the Paduspanid dynasty from 1117 to 1168. He was the son and successor of Hazarasp I.

Biography 
In 1140, the Seljuq Sultan Ahmad Sanjar sent an army under Abbas, the amir of Ray, to invade Mazandaran and conquer the domains of his vassal the Bavandid ruler Ali I. Abbas captured Amol, and several minor rulers of Mazandaran submitted to him, but Ali I urged Shahrivash not to submit to the latter. After some time, Ali made peace with Abbas. In 1142, Ali was succeeded by his son Shah Ghazi Rustam IV, but was shortly challenged by his brother Taj al-Muluk Mardavij, who was supported by Ahmad Sanjar and Shahrivash. However, Shahrivash later changed side and supported Shah Ghazi Rustam IV. Shah Ghazi Rustam IV shortly rewarded Shahrivash by giving him his daughter (or sister), including the two cities Natal and Paydasht. Shahrivash later died in 1168, and was succeeded by his brother Kai Ka'us I.

Sources 

 

12th-century monarchs in Asia
12th-century Iranian people
1129 deaths
Baduspanids
Year of birth missing